Pablo Ansaldo (2 March 1935 – 30 October 2016) was an Ecuadorian footballer. He played in four matches for the Ecuador national football team in 1963. He was also part of Ecuador's squad for the 1963 South American Championship.

References

External links
 

1935 births
2016 deaths
Ecuadorian footballers
Ecuador international footballers
Association football goalkeepers
Barcelona S.C. footballers
Sportspeople from Guayaquil